Erkki Puolakka (17 May 1925 – 22 December 2008) was a Finnish long-distance runner. He competed in the marathon at the 1952 Summer Olympics.

References

External links
 

1925 births
2008 deaths
Athletes (track and field) at the 1952 Summer Olympics
Finnish male long-distance runners
Finnish male marathon runners
Olympic athletes of Finland
People from Tervo
Sportspeople from North Savo